W. E. "Tick" Houston was a Negro league infielder between 1909 and 1920.

Houston made his Negro leagues debut in 1909 with the Birmingham Giants. He went on to play for several teams through 1920, including the West Baden Sprudels, Louisville White Sox, Indianapolis ABCs, and Kansas City Monarchs.

References

External links
 and Baseball-Reference Black Baseball stats and Seamheads

Place of birth missing
Place of death missing
Year of birth missing
Year of death missing
Birmingham Giants players
Indianapolis ABCs players
Kansas City Monarchs players
Louisville White Sox (1914-1915) players
West Baden Sprudels players
Baseball infielders